Portsmouth Central was a borough constituency in Portsmouth.  It returned one Member of Parliament (MP) to the House of Commons of the Parliament of the United Kingdom, elected by the first past the post system.

History 

The constituency was created for the 1918 general election, when the Representation of the People Act 1918 divided the two-member Portsmouth constituency into three new constituencies; North, South and Central.  It was abolished for the 1950 general election.

Boundaries
The County Borough of Portsmouth wards of Buckland, Fratton, Kingston, St Mary, and Town Hall.

Members of Parliament

Elections in the 1910s

Elections in the 1920s

Elections in the 1930s

Elections in the 1940s 
General Election 1939–40:

Another General Election was required to take place before the end of 1940. The political parties had been making preparations for an election to take place from 1939 and by the end of this year, the following candidates had been selected; 
Conservative: Ralph Beaumont
 Labour: Peter R Pain

References
 

Parliamentary constituencies in Hampshire (historic)
Constituencies of the Parliament of the United Kingdom established in 1918
Constituencies of the Parliament of the United Kingdom disestablished in 1950
Politics of Portsmouth